Myersiohyla chamaeleo is a frog in the family Hylidae, endemic to Amazonas, Venezuela.  Scientists have seen it on the Tepui Cerro de la Neblina between 1450 and 2100 meters above sea level.

Original description

References

chamaeleo
Frogs of South America
Amphibians described in 2013